The 16505/16506 Gandhidham–Bangalore City Express is an Express train belonging to South Western Railway zone that runs between  and  in India. It is currently being operated with 16505/16506 train numbers on a weekly basis.

Service

The 16505/Gandhidham–KSR Bengaluru Express has an average speed of 46 km/hr and covers 1955 km in 42 hrs 15 mins.
The 16506/KSR Bengaluru–Gandhidham Express has an average speed of 51 km/hr and covers 1955 km in 38 hrs 40 mins.

Route and halts 

The important halts of the train are:

Coach composition

The train has standard ICF rakes with a max speed of 110 kmph. The train consists of 24 coaches:

 1 AC I Tier
 2 AC II Tier
 3 AC III Tier
 11 Sleeper coaches
 4 General Unreserved
 2 Seating cum Luggage Rake
 1 Pantry car

As is customary with most train services in India, coach composition may be amended at the discretion of Indian Railways depending on demand.

Schedule

Traction

Both trains are hauled by a Diesel Loco Shed, Hubli-based WDP-4 diesel locomotive from Bangalore to Gandhidham and vice versa.

Rake sharing 

The train shares its rake with 16573/16574 Yesvantpur–Puducherry Weekly Express, 16533/16534 Jodhpur–Bangalore City Express (via Guntakal), 16533/16534 Ajmer–Bangalore City Garib Nawaz Express and 16507/16508 Jodhpur–Bangalore City Express (via Hubballi).

See also 

 Bangalore City railway station
 Gandhidham Junction railway station
 Yesvantpur–Puducherry Weekly Express
 Jodhpur–Bangalore City Express (via Guntakal)
 Ajmer–Bangalore City Garib Nawaz Express
 Jodhpur–Bangalore City Express (via Hubballi)

Notes

References

External links 

 16505/Gandhidham–KSR Bengaluru Express India Rail Info
 16506/KSR Bengaluru–Gandhidham Express India Rail Info

Transport in Gandhidham
Transport in Bangalore
Express trains in India
Rail transport in Gujarat
Rail transport in Maharashtra
Rail transport in Karnataka
Railway services introduced in 2002